Charles Wilhelm Daniel Schlee (July 21, 1873 – January 5, 1947) was an American racing cyclist who competed 1902–1911, mostly in New Jersey. He was born in Copenhagen, Denmark and died in Cambridge, Maryland.

He competed in Cycling at the 1904 Summer Olympics in St Louis, Missouri and won the gold medal in the 5 mile race.

He also competed in the following events:
1/3 mile - fourth position
1/2 mile - eliminated in the semifinals
1 mile - eliminated in the first round
2 miles - place unknown
25 miles - did not finish

References

External links
profile

1873 births
1947 deaths
American male cyclists
American track cyclists
Cyclists at the 1904 Summer Olympics
Olympic gold medalists for the United States in cycling
Olympic medalists in cycling
Medalists at the 1904 Summer Olympics
Danish emigrants to the United States